The grey-backed hawk (Pseudastur occidentalis) is an Endangered species of bird of prey in subfamily Accipitrinae, the "true" hawks, of family Accipitridae. It is found in Ecuador and far northern Peru.

Taxonomy and systematics

The grey-backed hawk was traditionally placed in genus Leucopternis but following a 2006 paper, taxonomists moved it and two other species to genus Pseudastur. The grey-backed hawk is monotypic.

Description

Females are about 10% larger than males and both sexes have the same plumage. Adults have a gray and white streaked head, nape, and mantle. They have blackish gray upperparts and a mostly white tail with a wide black band near the end. Their eye is dark brown, their cere gray, and their legs and feet pale yellow. Immatures have brownish gray upperparts, a dusky-striped nape, and gray spots on the breast.

Distribution and habitat

The grey-backed hawk is found locally in western Ecuador between southern Esmeraldas and Loja provinces and slightly into Peru's Department of Tumbes. It inhabits subtropical and tropical semi-deciduous and evergreen forest, cloudforest, and secondary forest. It prefers moist areas and is often found in steep ravines.

Behavior

Movement

The grey-backed hawk is sedentary.

Feeding

The grey-backed hawk's hunting method and diet are not well defined. It has been recorded hunting over streams and croplands and sometimes up to four will hunt together. Its diet includes reptiles, amphibians, crabs, rodents, birds, and large insects.

Breeding

The grey-backed hawk appears to nest at any time of the year but its breeding activity appears to be concentrated between December and April, the local rainy season. Pairs make display flights. Nothing else is known about its breeding biology.

Vocalization

During the grey-backed hawk's display flights, one bird will make a "drawn-out screeching keeeaaarr-keeeaaarr... (which rises in central portion) or, alternatively, a high-pitched kéééoooowww".

Status

The IUCN originally assessed the grey-backed hawk as Threatened but since 1994 has classed it as Endangered. It has a small range and its estimated population of 250 to 1000 mature individuals is believed to be decreasing. The population is fragmented. Its forest habitat is undergoing continuing destruction for timber and agriculture. Even some nominally protected areas are illegally logged and cleared. The "combination of clearance for agriculture and timber supplies and intense grazing (by goats and cattle) in understorey has made [the western] Ecuadorian forests one of [the] world’s most threatened ecosystems."

References

grey-backed hawk
Birds of Ecuador
grey-backed hawk
grey-backed hawk
Taxonomy articles created by Polbot